Kori Cheverie (born June 18, 1987) is a Canadian retired ice hockey player, currently serving as assistant coach of the Canadian national women's ice hockey team and of the Ryerson Rams men's ice hockey team. She was the first woman to be hired to a full-time coaching role in U Sports men's ice hockey history.

Cheverie's playing career was spent with the Saint Mary's Huskies women's ice hockey team in the Atlantic University Sport conference of Canadian Interuniversity Sport (CIS; renamed U Sports in 2016) and with the Toronto Furies of the Canadian Women's Hockey League (CWHL), with whom she won the 2014 Clarkson Cup.

Playing career

CIS
With the St. Mary's Huskies women's ice hockey program, Cheverie was an Academic All-Canadian, team captain and multiple conference nominee for the Marion Hillard Award.

CWHL
A charter member of the Toronto Furies, Cheverie spent six years with the franchise, starting in their inaugural season of 2010-11.

Cheverie made her CWHL debut on October 23, 2010, in a 7–3 loss against the Brampton Thunder. Les than 30 seconds into the second period, Cheverie scored a power play goal in the second period. The assists were credited to LaToya Clarke and fellow rookie Tessa Bonhomme. Said goal was scored on Erika Vanderveer, who would become a future Furies teammate during the 2012–13 season.

Twice during her rookie season, she registered a pair of three point performances. Both against the Boston Blades, the first occurred on January 9, 2011, in 9–4 final, while the second took place on March 11, 2011.

She would finish her rookie season ranked third on the team in scoring, behind fellow rookie Britni Smith (who went on to win the 2011 CWHL Rookie of the Year Award) and Jennifer Botterill.

Having retired from the Furies in 2016, she retired with three franchise records: points (82), games played (152) and power play goals (14). In addition, she holds the league record for most consecutive games played with 152.

The final points of her CWHL career actually occurred in her final regular season game, a February 14, 2016 contest against the Brampton Thunder. Cheverie logged a pair of power play goals in the third period to force overtime. Her final goal was scored at the 18:39 mark of the third period, with Natalie Spooner and Kelly Terry earning the assists. Said goal was scored against Brampton goaltender Erica Howe. Cheverie would finish the 2015–16 season leading the Furies in game-winning goals while ranking second to Spooner in team scoring, respectively.

International hockey
During January 2009, Cheverie was named to the team that competed at the International University Sports Federation (FISU) Winter Universiade in Harbin, China. She would be part of the Canadian squad that would claim the gold medal in the women's ice hockey event.

Cheverie also competed internationally with the Italian women's national ball hockey team. Participating at the 2015 World Championship, she led the tournament in penalty minutes and tallied three points.

As a walk-on member of the Italian team, she appeared in all of the team's seven games. Her first point came on a June 23 match against Switzerland, a 6–2 victory for Italy. During the second period, Cheverie scored a power play goal as Annalisa Mazzarello and Nicole Corriero earned the assists.

On June 27, Cheverie registered her only multi-point game at the event, logging a goal and an assist in a 3–1 victory against Great Britain. She would assist on a goal scored by Corriero, while scoring Italy's final goal of the game.

Coaching career
In addition to her coaching role with the Ryerson Rams men's ice hockey team, Cheverie has also worked as Ryerson's Skate Training Specialist. Her work as a specialist was implemented as part of the Ryerson Hockey Development program.

Cheverie joined the Scarborough Sharks Midget AA girls team during the 2015–16 season as an assistant coach. She was appointed the Sharks head coach in the summer of 2016. During the summer of 2016, she also worked with referee Vanessa Stratton in New Zealand, working with the coaching staff of the New Zealand women's national ice hockey team to help develop the game there.

Prior to Ryerson and Midget AA, Cheverie served as a coach with Hockey Nova Scotia from April to August 2012, coaching youth aged 15–17 years old. In the summer of 2014, Cheverie went to Shanghai and Beijing to participate in a hockey camp for kids. From August 2013 to August 2014, Cheverie also held a position with Maple Leaf Sports & Entertainment in Hockey Development and Community Relations.

On January 18, 2021, Hockey Canada announced that Cheverie had been named to the coaching staff of the Canadian national women's team.

Career stats

Awards and honours
2006-07 AUS First Team All-Star 
2007-08 AUS First Team All-Star 
2009-10 AUS First Team All-Star   
2006-07 CIS Academic All-Canadian 
2006-07 AUS Marion Hilliard Award winner, nominee CIS Marion Hilliard Award 
2007-08 AUS Marion Hilliard Award winner, nominee CIS Marion Hilliard Award  
2008-09 AUS Marion Hilliard Award winner, nominee CIS Marion Hilliard Award 
2006-07 Saint Mary's Female Athlete of the Year 
2007-08 Saint Mary's Female Athlete of the Year 
2006-07 Most Valuable Player for St. Mary's women's hockey 
2007-08 Most Valuable Player for St. Mary's women's hockey 
2008-09 Most Valuable Player for St. Mary's women's hockey

References

External links

Clarkson Cup champions
1987 births
Living people
Toronto Furies players
Canadian women's ice hockey forwards
Universiade gold medalists for Canada
Universiade medalists in ice hockey
Competitors at the 2009 Winter Universiade